Ceroplesis capensis is a species of beetle in the family Cerambycidae. It was described by Carl Linnaeus in 1764. It is known from South Africa.

References

capensis
Beetles described in 1764
Taxa named by Carl Linnaeus